Karola Schustereder (born 15 October 1966) is an Austrian rower. She competed in the women's lightweight double sculls event at the 1996 Summer Olympics.

References

External links
 

1966 births
Living people
Austrian female rowers
Olympic rowers of Austria
Rowers at the 1996 Summer Olympics
People from Gmunden
Sportspeople from Upper Austria